Taldom transmitter is a large facility for longwave and shortwave broadcasting located near Taldom, Russia. It transmits on two longwave frequencies, on 153 kHz with 300 kW and on 261 kHz with a power of 2500 kW, the latter is, according to the World Radio TV Handbook's listings, the most powerful broadcasting station in the world. There are two longwave transmissions aerial systems: a single 257 metres tall mast radiator for 153 kHz and a ring antenna system consisting of five masts arranged in a circle around a 275 metre high guyed mast for 261 kHz. The latter antenna delivers good skywave suppression. The shortwave antenna system consists of several masts arranged in a row which are interconnected by cables at various heights.

See also
 List of masts

External links
 
 http://www.skyscraperpage.com/diagrams/?b46237

Radio masts and towers in Europe
Towers in Russia